Star Trek is a 2009 American science fiction film produced by Spyglass Entertainment and Bad Robot Productions, and was distributed by Paramount Pictures. It was written by Roberto Orci and Alex Kurtzman; the producers of the film were Damon Lindelof and J. J. Abrams, the latter of which also directed the film. It is the eleventh film in the Star Trek film franchise and is also a reboot that features the main characters of the original Star Trek television series, portrayed by a new cast. The film follows James T. Kirk (Chris Pine) and Spock (Zachary Quinto) aboard the USS Enterprise as they combat a Romulan from the future who threatens the United Federation of Planets as he seeks his revenge.

Following an unexpected public screening on April 6, 2009, at the Alamo Drafthouse theater in Austin, Texas, the world premiere took place at the Sydney Opera House in Sydney, Australia on April 7, 2009. Official screenings in the United States started at 7 pm on May 7, 2009, grossing $4 million on its opening day and more than $79 million domestically by the end of the weekend. Star Trek ended its United States theatrical run on October 1, 2009, with a box office total exceeding $257 million, which placed it as the seventh highest-grossing film for 2009 behind The Hangover. The film took a total worldwide gross of over $385 million on a production budget of $150 million. Rotten Tomatoes, a review aggregator, surveyed 299 reviews and judged 95 percent to be positive.

Star Trek garnered 32 awards out of 110 nominations, with work on the sound and special effects highlighted by a number of award ceremonies they were represented at. Furthermore, the cast – including Pine, Quinto and Zoe Saldana – were also recognised on an individual basis. The most success received by the film was at the Scream Awards where it took home six awards in a single ceremony out of seventeen nominations. Amongst the nominations received by the film, there were three at the British Academy Film Awards, five at the Critics' Choice Movie Awards, four at the People's Choice Awards, and single nominations at both the Grammy Awards, and the Writers Guild of America Awards. The film was also the first in the Star Trek franchise to win an Academy Award, with Barney Burman, Mindy Hall and Joel Harlow winning for Best Makeup and Hairstyling.

Awards and nominations

See also 

2009 in film

Notes

References

External links
 

List of accolades received by Star Trek (film)
Lists of accolades by film
Lists of Star Trek awards and nominations